This is a list of notable chocolatiers. A chocolatier is a person or business who makes confectionery from chocolate. Chocolatiers are distinct from chocolate makers, who create chocolate from cacao beans and other ingredients.

Chocolatiers

Michel Allex
Louis Barnett
Anthon Berg
Fran Bigelow
John Cadbury
Pascal Caffet
Thomas Caffrey
François-Louis Cailler
María Fernanda Di Giacobbe
Gilbert Ganong
Jacques Genin
Domingo Ghirardelli
Mott Green
Harry Specters
Milton S. Hershey
Jean-Paul Hévin
Ernest Hillier
Coenraad Johannes van Houten
Hans Imhoff
JaCiva's Bakery and Chocolatier, Portland, Oregon
Andreas Jacobs
Klaus Johann Jacobs
Leonidas Kestekides
Fritz Knipschildt
Charles-Amédée Kohler
Emeril Lagasse
Norman Love
Franklin Clarence Mars
Menier family
Antoine Brutus Menier
Émile-Justin Menier
Daniel Peter
H.B. Reese
Robert Steinberg
Philippe Suchard
Joseph William Thornton
Paul A. Young
Herman Wockenfuss

See also
 Candy making
 Chocolaterie
 List of bean-to-bar chocolate manufacturers

External links
 

Chocolatiers